Torian Graham (born March 26, 1993) is an American professional basketball player who last played for New Heroes Den Bosch of the Dutch Basketball League (DBL). He played college basketball for Arizona State Sun Devils.

College career
Graham played college basketball for the Arizona State Sun Devils. In his senior year, he averaged 18.6 points per game. He was the second highest scorer of the Pac-12 conference, only behind Markelle Fultz. He made 108 three-pointers on the season, shooting 38.7% from three-point range on the season. The 108 made three-pointers is 7th all-time in Pac-12 single-season history.

Professional career
After going undrafted in the 2017 NBA Draft, Graham played for Dallas Mavericks in the summer league of Las Vegas.

In July 2017, Spanish club Tecnyconta Zaragoza and Graham reached an agreement for the 2017–18 season. He was waived without making his debut with the team.

In October, Graham signed with the Utah Jazz of the NBA.  In  November 2017, the Jazz assigned him to their G League affiliate, the Salt Lake City Stars, and he averaged 8.1 points and 2.2 rebounds in 15 minutes per game. He signed with APOEL B.C. of the Cyprus Basketball Division A on August 28, 2018.

On January 19, 2019, Graham signed with New Heroes Den Bosch of the Dutch Basketball League (DBL). He signed a contract for the remainder of the 2018–19 season. On February 8, 2018, he scored 28 points on 11–14 shooting, in a 55–88 win over Den Helder. On February 27, 2019, New Heroes released Graham by mutual consent. In four DBL games with Den Bosch, he averaged 15 points per game.

References

External links
 Estadísticas en la NCAA
 
 in ESPN
 Ficha en ACB.com
 RealGM profile

1993 births
Living people
American expatriate basketball people in Cyprus
American expatriate basketball people in Mexico
American expatriate basketball people in the Netherlands
American men's basketball players
APOEL B.C. players
Arizona State Sun Devils men's basketball players
Basketball players from North Carolina
Chipola Indians men's basketball players
Gigantes de Jalisco players
Heroes Den Bosch players
Dutch Basketball League players
Passlab Yamagata Wyverns players
Salt Lake City Stars players
Small forwards
Sportspeople from Durham, North Carolina
Saigon Heat players